This is a list of notable artists who work primarily in the medium of the pin-up.

A 
 Arnold Armitage
 Rolf Armstrong
 Aslan

B 
 Joyce Ballantyne
 McClelland Barclay
 Vaughan Alden Bass
 Ben-Hur Baz
 Julie Bell
 Earle K. Bergey
 Roy Best
 Charles Binger
 Enoch Bolles
 Mark Boyle
 Harry C. Bradley
 Nicole Brune
 Al Buell

C 
 J. Scott Campbell
 Joe Chiodo
 Chris Cooper
 Howard Chandler Christy

D 
 Olivia De Berardinis
 Ruth Deckard
 Joseph F. DeMartini
 Archie Dickens
 Jessica Dougherty
 Peter Driben

E 
 Edward M. Eggleston
 Gil Elvgren
 Harry Ekman

F 
 Art Frahm
 Pearl Frush

G 
 Jacob Gestman Geradts
 Charles Dana Gibson
 Shane Glines

H 
 Greg Hildebrandt
 Josh Howard
 Adam Hughes
 Jon Hul

I 
 Idda van Munster

K 
 Irving Klaw

M 

 Milo Manara
 Nathaniel Milljour
 Earl Moran
 Zoë Mozert
 Morgana Festugato

N 
 Patrick Nagel

O
Jackie Ormes

P 
 George Petty
 Coles Phillips
 Jay Scott Pike
 Andrew Posada

R 
 Mel Ramos
 Virgil Reilly
 Al Rio
 Luis Royo
 Donald L. Rust

S 
 Arthur Sarnoff
 Hajime Sorayama
 Annie Sprinkle
 Dave Stevens
 Marjorie Strider
 Haddon Sundblom

T 
 Bruce Timm

V 
 Boris Vallejo
 Alberto Vargas
 Baron Von Lind

W 
 Bill Ward
 Dee Whitcomb
 Ted Withers
 David Wright

Y 
 Dean Yeagle

Pin-up artists